Heartland with John Kasich (originally titled From the Heartland with John Kasich) is an American news/talk television program hosted by John Kasich that appeared on Fox News Channel from 2001 to 2007.

Show 
The show debuted in 2001. It was broadcast live every Saturday at 8:00 p.m. ET. Unlike most programming on Fox News Channel that was filmed in New York City or Washington D.C., the show was based in Kasich's hometown of Columbus, Ohio.

Heartland was similar in format to Bill O'Reilly's news program The O'Reilly Factor. Some of the stories were similar to a wrap up of the events that happened during the week on The O'Reilly Factor. Kasich has also frequently been a substitute host of The O'Reilly Factor.

The final edition of Heartland with John Kasich aired on April 21, 2007. Three years later, Kasich was elected as governor of Ohio, and was elected for a second term in 2014.

References

External links
 Heartland at FoxNews.com

Fox News original programming
2000s American television news shows
2001 American television series debuts
2007 American television series endings
John Kasich